Baisha Township is a township in Pu'an County, Guizhou province, China. , it has one residential community and 4 villages under its administration.

See also 
 List of township-level divisions of Guizhou

References 

Townships of Guizhou
Pu'an County